Pseudoligostigma punctissimalis is a moth in the family Crambidae described by Harrison Gray Dyar Jr. in 1914. It is found from north-western Costa Rica to Panama and Trinidad.

References

Glaphyriinae